Puerto Rico competed at the 1996 Summer Olympics in Atlanta, United States. 69 competitors, 47 men and 22 women, took part in 60 events in 16 sports.

Medalists

Bronze
 Daniel Santos — Boxing, Men's Welterweight

Archery

In the fifth time the nation competed in archery at the Olympics, Puerto Rico entered one woman.  She finished in last place.

Women's Individual Competition:
 Maria Reyes → Round of 64, 64th place (0-1)

Athletics

Men's 400m Hurdles
Domingo Cordero
 Heat — 51.20 (→ did not advance)

Men's Marathon
 Maximo Oliveras – 2:47.15 (→ 106th place)

Basketball

Men's tournament

Preliminary round

9–12th Place classification match

9th Place match

Boxing

Men's Flyweight (– 51 kg)
Omar Adorno
 First Round — Lost to Igor Samoilenco (Moldova) on points (8-20)

Men's Bantamweight (– 54 kg)
José Miguel Cotto
 First Round — Lost to Raimkul Malakhbekov (Russia) on points (6-16)

Men's Featherweight (– 57 kg)
Luis Seda
 First Round — Lost to Kamsing Somluck (Thailand) on points (2-13)

Men's Light-Welterweight (– 63,5 kg)
Luis Deines Pérez
 First Round — Lost to Jacek Bielski (Poland) on points (2-18)

Men's Welterweight (– 67 kg)
Daniel Santos
 First Round — Defeated Ernest Atangana Mboa (Cameroon) RSC-1 (02:54)
 Second Round — Defeated Kabil Lahsen (Morocco) on points (16-4)
 Quarterfinals — Defeated Nariman Atayev (Uzbekistan) on points (28-15)
 Semifinals — Lost to Oleg Saitov (Russia) on points (11-13)

Men's Light-Middleweight (– 71 kg)
José Luis Quiñones
 First Round — Lost to Antonio Perugino (Italy) on points (8-10)

Men's Light-Heavyweight (– 81 kg)
Enrique Flores
 First Round — Defeated Gurcharn Singh (India) on points (15-7)
 Second Round — Defeated Sybrand Botes (South Africa) on points (16-7)
 Quarterfinals — Lost to Antonio Tarver (United States) RSC-3 (01:54)

Cycling

Track Competition
Men's Points Race
 Juan Merheb
 Final — did not finish (→ no ranking)

Diving

Men's 3m Springboard
Ramon Sandin
 Preliminary Heat — 302.55 (→ did not advance, 29th place)

Women's 3m Springboard
Vivian Alberty
 Preliminary Heat — 195.18 (→ did not advance, 27th place)

Equestrianism

Fencing

One female fencer represented Puerto Rico in 1996.

Women's épée
 Mitch Escanellas

Gymnastics

Judo

Men's Extra-Lightweight
Melvin Méndez

Men's Half-Lightweight
José Pérez

Men's Lightweight
Francisco Rodríguez

Men's Half-Middleweight
José Luis Figueroa

Sailing

Shooting

Softball

Women's Team Competition
Preliminary Round Robin
Lost to United States (0:10)
Lost to Canada (0:4)
Defeated Australia (2:0)
Lost to PR China (0:10)
Lost to Chinese Taipei (2:10)
Lost to Japan (1:8)
Lost to Netherlands (0:2)
Semifinals
 Did not advance → 8th place

Team roster
Lourdes Baez
Sheree Corniel
Ivelisse Echevarría
Maria González
Elba Lebrón
Lisa Martínez
Aída Miranda
Lisa Mize
Jacqueine Ortíz
Janice Parks
Penelope Rosario
Sandra Rosario
Myriam Segarra
Eve Soto
Clara Vázquez
Head coach: José Agosto

Swimming

Men's 50m Freestyle
 Ricardo Busquets
 Heat – 22.61
 Final – 22.73 (→ 8th place)

Men's 100m Freestyle
 Ricardo Busquets
 Heat – 49.61
 Final – 49.68 (→ 7th place)

Men's 100m Breaststroke
 Todd Torres
 Heat – 1:03.08 (→ did not advance, 21st place)

Men's 200m Breaststroke
 Todd Torres
 Heat – 2:22.66 (→ did not advance, 30th place)

Men's 100m Butterfly
 Ricardo Busquets
 Heat – 53.90
 B-Final – 53.65 (→ 12th place)

Men's 200m Individual Medley
 Arsenio López
 Heat – 2:07.09 (→ did not advance, 27th place)

Men's 400m Individual Medley
 Arsenio López
 Heat – 4:18.34 (→ did not advance, 25th place)

Men's 4 × 100 m Freestyle Relay
 Eduardo González, José González, Arsenio López, and Ricardo Busquets
 Heat – 3:28.27 (→ did not advance, 16th place)

Men's 4 × 100 m Medley Relay
 Carlos Bodega, Todd Torres, Ricardo Busquets, and José González
 Heat – 3:52.04 (→ did not advance, 19th place)

Weightlifting

Men's Bantamweight
César Rodríguez

Wrestling

See also
Puerto Rico at the 1995 Pan American Games

Notes

References

Nations at the 1996 Summer Olympics
1996
Olympics